Abnow (also Romanized as Abnow and Ābnū; also known as Abnūh) is a village in Hamaijan Rural District, Hamaijan District, Sepidan County, Fars Province, Iran. At the 2006 census, its population was 1,196, in 278 families.

References 

Populated places in Sepidan County